The Cincinnati–Louisville rivalry is a college sports rivalry between the University of Cincinnati Bearcats and the University of Louisville Cardinals. Both universities share common characteristics, both being over 200 year old institutions in urban settings. The schools have also shared conferences historically, with the rivalry stretching over the span of four conferences from the Missouri Valley Conference, to the Metro Conference to Conference USA, and more recently in the Big East Conference, which in 2013 was renamed to the American Athletic Conference. After the 2013–14 season, Louisville joined the Atlantic Coast Conference  and since then the rivalry has been put on hiatus in football and basketball. Cincinnati will officially join the Big 12 conference in 2023. However, many other sports at the universities, such as baseball, continue to battle periodically.

History

Both universities have traced parallel paths, from their early foundation in the early nineteenth century as municipal universities to their later growth into state sponsored institutions in the 1960s and 70s. Due to their close proximity, the universities became early athletic opponents as college athletics developed first facing off in 1921 in a men's college basketball game. Additionally, this proximity led to both schools being members of the Missouri Valley Conference, Metro Conference, Conference USA, and the Big East Conference historically. While the rivalry was represented annually in Football from 1966–1992 and 1996–2013, the true intensity of the rivalry was felt on the basketball court. Legendary coaches Denny Crum, Bob Huggins, and Rick Pitino each played their part in famous wins for each program and fanning the flames of the matchup.

In the last year of the rivalry in football and basketball for the foreseeable future, the contests lived up to the pressure. In the battle for The Keg of Nails, Teddy Bridgewater led the No. 19 Cardinals to an overtime comeback at Nippert Stadium much to the ire of the Bearcat faithful. On the hardwood both teams would claim upset, ranked wins at their opponent's home court. Sean Kilpatrick lead the Bearcats to a 69–66 victory at the KFC Yum! Center while Russ Smith and the Cardinals would beat the Bearcats 58–57 at Fifth Third Arena in their last matchup as conference foes.

On April 30, 2019 John Brannen and Chris Mack exchanged tweets announcing a renewal of the Cincinnati–Louisville rivalry with the first game at Fifth Third Arena. The series was delayed first due to the COVID-19 pandemic. Chris Mack later confirmed that the series would not be played during the 2021–22 season, putting the resumption of the rivalry into question.

Football

Men's basketball

Cincinnati and Louisville were rivals, first playing in 1921, until the 2010–14 NCAA conference realignment put the contest on hiatus, as Louisville moved to the Atlantic Coast Conference on July 1, 2014. The teams have faced off 99 times in basketball series history, with Louisville leading the all-time series 53–43.

The Bearcats and Cardinals have played in eight conference tournaments, with the Bearcats and Cardinals tied at 4–4. Louisville won all 3 games in the Metro Conference with Cincinnati winning all 3 games in Conference USA. The teams split 1–1 in the Big East tournament.

The teams have also met twice in the NCAA Tournament, tied overall at 1–1.

Notable games
March 21, 1959: The Bearcats met the Cardinals on their home court, Freedom Hall, for the Third Place game of the NCAA tournament. Oscar Robertson would score 39 points, earning the first triple double in Final Four history, leading his Bearcats to a 98–85 victory.

January 21, 1967: The No. 2 Cardinals led by eventual All-American Wes Unseld visited the Armory Fieldhouse to take on the Bearcats. Despite the difference in talent, the entire game was close. With two seconds remaining, Bearcat Gordie Smith threw in a fifteen foot jumper to win the game 59–58 for UC.

March 20, 1975: The No. 3 Cardinals collided with the No. 12 Bearcats in the Sweet Sixteen of the NCAA tournament. Louisville took a solid lead in the first half which proved too much for the Bearcats to overcome, seeing the Cardinals win 78–63. Louisville would go on to finish 3rd overall in the tournament.

January 7, 1978: The Bearcats entered the matchup, tied for the longest home winning streak in the nation at 60 games. The first matchup at Riverfront Coliseum, No. 10 Louisville would snap the Cincinnati streak, winning 78–75.

March 8, 1981: The reigning National Champion Cardinals took on the Bearcats in the final of the Metro Conference tournament at Freedom Hall. In an ugly, low-scoring affair, the Cardinals were triumphant in the game to a score of 42–31.

January 20, 1986: The Bearcats headed to Freedom Hall to take on the No. 18, and eventual national champion, Cardinals. With Louisville pulling ahead their lead, Bearcat Roger McClendon would score 24 of his 35 points in the second half to gain an 84–82 victory for Cincinnati.

March 8, 1996: In 1991 Cincinnati left the Metro Conference to form the Great Midwest Conference, putting the rivalry on a five-year hiatus. In 1995, the Great Midwest and Metro combined to form Conference USA bringing the Bearcats and Cardinals back into the same conference. No. 21 Louisville took the first game 72–66 at the Shoemaker Center in February, but with revenge on their mind the Bob Huggins lead No. 8 Bearcats defeated No. 22 Louisville in the Conference tournament Quarterfinals 92–81. In the NCAA tournament the Bearcats advanced to the Elite Eight and the Cardinals made it to the Sweet Sixteen.

February 22, 2003: No. 4 Louisville traveled to Cincinnati and were stunned by the 31 point performance of Leonard Stokes that would help navigate the Bearcats to the 101–80 upset of the Cardinals. The Bearcats would also set a school record, shooting 42-of-58 on free throws in the game.

March 11, 2004: Cincinnati and Louisville faced off in the 2004 Conference USA men's basketball tournament hosted at US Bank Arena in Cincinnati. After splitting the regular season matchups, the Bearcats proved too much for Rick Pitino's Cardinals winning 64–62 after Armein Kirkland banked a shot in for the Bearcats with only 16.9 seconds remaining. The No. 13 Bearcats would go on to win the conference tournament. This game was Huggins's last victory in the matchup.

March 10, 2012†: In an unlikely Big East tournament championship game, Louisville and Cincinnati faced off, with Mick Cronin coaching against his former boss Pitino. Cincinnati fought their way past No. 13 Georgetown in double overtime and No. 2 Syracuse while Louisville beat No. 9 Marquette and No. 23 Notre Dame. Louisville ended up winning the tilt 50–44, in what was the lowest scoring championship game in Big East history. Both teams made runs in the NCAA tournament with Cincinnati advancing to the Sweet Sixteen and Louisville making it to the Final Four.

February 22, 2014†: In the last matchup between rivals before Louisville left for the Atlantic Coast Conference the teams met at Fifth Third Arena. No. 7 Cincinnati and No. 11 Louisville played in a memorable, blow-for-blow game which would see Sean Kilpatrick record 28 points. However, in the dwindling seconds of the second half, Russ Smith scored with 3 seconds remaining, earning Louisville a 58–57 victory.

November 23, 2022†: In their first matchup since 2014 the two rivals played in a 7th place game at the Maui Invitational. This game was not as memorable as the last as Cincinnati routed Louisville 81-62. 

† Denotes game vacated by Louisville

Game results
Rankings are from the AP Poll (1936–present)

Notes

A 1959 NCAA Third Place Game
B 1975 NCAA Sweet Sixteen
C 1981 Metro Conference men's basketball tournament
D 1984 Metro Conference men's basketball tournament
E 1986 Metro Conference men's basketball tournament
F 1996 Conference USA men's basketball tournament
G 1998 Conference USA men's basketball tournament
H 2004 Conference USA men's basketball tournament
I 2010 Big East men's basketball tournament
J 2012 Big East men's basketball tournament
K 2022 Maui Invitational Tournament

Wins by location

Wins by venue

Women’s Basketball

Louisville leads the all time contest in women's basketball 41–27. As with men's basketball and football, the teams have not played since Louisville departed for the Atlantic Coast Conference after the 2013–14 season.

Baseball

One of the series that has continued since conference realignment has been games between the baseball teams. The teams have continued to play yearly, with the two having faced off 182 times in their history after first playing in 1924. Louisville leads the series all time, 100–82 as of the 2021 season.

In 2013, Cincinnati and Louisville played the first ever college baseball game at Great American Ballpark, the home of the Cincinnati Reds on April 6, 2013. The No. 9 Cardinals would defeat the Bearcats 4–1.

On March 21, 2017, the No. 1 Louisville Cardinals played the Cincinnati Bearcats at UC Baseball Stadium. Cincinnati pulled off an upset, beating Louisville 6–3 and handing the Cardinals their first loss of the season.

On March 30, 2021, the No. 5 Louisville Cardinals were again upset by the Bearcats, 13-12 in a walk-off 10th inning win for Cincinnati.

References

College basketball rivalries in the United States
Cincinnati Bearcats basketball
Louisville Cardinals basketball